Kabil is both a surname and given name. It may refer to:

People

Surname
Mahmoud Kabil (born 1946), Egyptian actor and political activist
Mohamed Kabil (born 1927), Egyptian footballer and Olympics competitor

Given name
Kabil Lahsen (born 1971), Moroccan boxer and Olympics competitor
Kabil Mahmoud ( 1920), Egyptian gymnast and Olympics competitor

Other
Pyar Ke Kabil, 1987 Indian Bollywood film

See also
Ghabel (disambiguation), related name
Qabil (disambiguation), related name